This is a list of notable antiques experts.

Antiques experts 

 Paul Atterbury
 Jon Baddeley
 David Barby
 David Battie
 Kate Bliss
 John Bly
 Eileen Rose Busby
 Bunny Campione
 Wes Cowan
 Norman Crider
 Ephraim Deinard
 Alastair Dickenson
 David Dickinson
 Dendy Easton
 Clive Farahar
 Helaine Fendelman
 Yosef Goldman
 Paul Hayes
 Jonty Hearnden
 Esta Henry
 Mark Hill
 Michael Hogben
 Lenon Hoyte
 Soame Jenyns
 Margaret Jourdain
 Hilary Kay
 Leigh and Leslie Keno
 Eric Knowles
 Ralph and Terry Kovel
 Graham Lay
 Wehhui Tom Liu
 Elyse Luray
 Rupert Maas
 Cordelia Mendoza
 Judith Miller
 Geoffrey Munn
 Peter Nahum
 Andrew Nebbett
 Arthur Negus
 Natasha Raskin Sharp
 Albert Sack
 Israel Sack
 Henry Sandon
 John Sandon
 Philip Serrell
 Lars Tharp
 Harvey Withers

 
antiques